Laophis (From Ancient Greek, People's snake) is a genus of viperid snake currently containing one known species that lived during the Pliocene in Northern Greece. Few fossil vertebrae of this species was found in Thessaloniki, Greece.
Originally described by Sir Richard Owen, the original fossils had been lost, until rediscovery of a single vertebra was discovered somewhere near Thessaloniki in 2014.

References

External links 
 

Viperidae
Taxa named by Richard Owen
Fossil taxa described in 1857